Ptiliodes is a genus of featherwing beetles in the beetle subfamily Ptiliinae tribe Ptiliini.

References

Ptiliidae
Staphyliniformia genera
Staphylinoidea